Sollers - Naberezhnye Chelny is a car plant of the Sollers JSC group located in Naberezhnye Chelny, Russia. It was formerly a carmaking company known as ZMA and produced the Oka micro-car under VAZ license.

Since 2015 the plant manufactures a Ford Fiesta sedan variant and Ford EcoSport on behalf of the Ford Sollers joint venture.

History

ZMA (Завод малолитражных автомобилей (ЗМА), Zavod Malolitrajnykh Avtomobileï, "plant of small displacement engine cars") was a Russian manufacturer of small cars. It was created on the basis of Decree No. 575 of 21 June 1985 the Council of Ministers of the USSR, as a standalone company, a subsidiary of KamAZ . Its headquarters are in Naberezhnye Chelny (Tatarstan). The plant construction was completed in November 1987 and the first car - a 1111-КамАЗ "Кама" came off the assembly line Dec. 21, 1987.

The company was purchased in March 2005 by Severstal-Avto who decided to stop production of old models and convert the company into the assembly and production of cars on behalf of foreign automakers.

Models

Current
SsangYong Rexton (since fall 2006)

Discontinued
Oka (1992–2006)
Fiat Palio (CKD, since spring 2007 to December 2010)
Fiat Albea (CKD, since spring 2007 to December 2010)
Fiat Doblò (CKD, since spring 2007 to December 2010)

See also
 Fiat-Sollers
 Ford Sollers

References

External links
Official website

Sollers JSC
Companies based in Tatarstan
Car manufacturers of the Soviet Union
Motor vehicle assembly plants in Russia
Naberezhnye Chelny